Turbonilla hespera is a species of sea snail, a marine gastropod mollusk in the family Pyramidellidae, the pyrams and their allies.

Description
The shell grows to a length of 5.3 mm.

Distribution
The type specimen was found in the Atlantic Ocean off Georgia, USA, at a depth of 538 m.

References

External links
 To Biodiversity Heritage Library (1 publication)
 To Encyclopedia of Life
 To USNM Invertebrate Zoology Mollusca Collection
 To ITIS
 To World Register of Marine Species

hespera
Gastropods described in 1927